Sivkovo is a rural locality (a village) in Vereshchaginsky District, Perm Krai, Russia.  The population was 22 as of 2010.

Geography 
Sivkovo is located 22 km north of Vereshchagino (the district's administrative centre) by road. Zyukayka is the nearest rural locality.

References 

Rural localities in Vereshchaginsky District